Rhododendron uvariifolium (紫玉盘杜鹃) is a rhododendron species native to southwestern Sichuan, southeastern Xizang, and northwestern Yunnan in China, where it grows at altitudes of . Flowers are white, pink, or rose, with crimson basal blotch and purple spots.

Synonyms
Rhododendron dendritrichum Balf.f. & Forrestmall>
Rhododendron monbeigii Rehder & E.H. Wilson
Rhododendron niphargum Balf.f. & Kingdon-Ward
Rhododendron uvariifolium var. griseum Cowan

References

"Rhododendron uvariifolium", Diels, Notes Roy. Bot. Gard. Edinburgh. 5: 213. 1912

uvariifolium